Forrest A. Crawford (May 10, 1881 – March 27, 1908) was a shortstop in Major League Baseball. He played for the St. Louis Cardinals.

References

External links

1881 births
1908 deaths
Major League Baseball shortstops
St. Louis Cardinals players
Houston Buffaloes players
Providence Grays (minor league) players
Baseball players from Texas
People from Rockdale, Texas